Congregation Agudath Shalom, also known as Agudas Sholom the Walnut Street Synagogue or the Walnut Street Shul, is an active, historic Open Orthodox Jewish synagogue at 145 Walnut Street in Chelsea, Massachusetts.

History
The congregation was founded in  1887.  The present building was erected in 1909, one year after the great fire that destroyed a third of the buildings in the city.  The architect was Harry Dustin Joll.  The congregation's previous building was destroyed in the great fire.

It is the oldest surviving synagogue in Chelsea, a city that was one-third Jewish at the time the synagogue was built.

The synagogue possesses a "remarkable" series of wall and ceiling frescoes painted by Jewish immigrant artists.  The "magnificent" carved Torah Ark was created by a noted Boston-area cabinetmaker who specialized in synagogue furniture, San Katz, in the 1920s.
The synagogue was added to the National Register of Historic Places in 1993.

2016
In 2016, Congregation Agudath Shalom hired Rabbi Lila Kagedan as its full-time spiritual leader.  Kagedan is the first graduate of Yeshivat Maharat to take the title of Rabbi for her work as a female Orthodox leader. She had previously worked and taught in the Boston area for over ten years. The Synagogue continues to operate as an Orthodox Shul. Kagedan is the first female rabbi of a U.S. Orthodox Jewish synagogue.

See also
National Register of Historic Places listings in Suffolk County, Massachusetts

References

External links
 Chelsea's Synagogues: Walnut Street Shul

Synagogues completed in 1909
Orthodox synagogues in Massachusetts
Synagogues on the National Register of Historic Places in Massachusetts
Buildings and structures in Suffolk County, Massachusetts
Romanesque Revival synagogues
National Register of Historic Places in Chelsea, Massachusetts
Open Orthodox Judaism